The ninth season of Akademi Fantasia premiered on 2 April 2011 and concluded on 12 June 2011 on the Astro Ria television channel. Aznil Nawawi made a comeback as host along with Fauziah Ahmad Daud and Hattan also made a comeback to judge.

The professional trainers as well as twelve students of this season were revealed in a press conference which took place in ÆON malls in Malaysia| ÆON AU2, Setiawangsa. On 2 April 2011, Amy Search was revealed to be the Principal for this season during Konsert Tirai Akademi Fantasia.

The season was originally planned to be the final season, however the series would subsequently be revived in 2013.

On 12 June 2011, Hazama Ahmad Azmi was crowned the winner of the ninth season of Akademi Fantasia, beating Lenaber Hadir.

This season attracted the lowest reception of votes in the history of Akademi Fantasia, with 3.74 million votes cast.

Format changes
Several new formats were also implemented in this season. For instance, the location for Diari Akademi Fantasia was disclosed which is at ÆON AU2, Setiawangsa. Students undergo their daily routine as a student of Akademi Fantasia in the second floor of the shopping complex for public viewing. This change is a departure from the previous eight seasons where the location for Diari Akademi Fantasia was not revealed.

Operasi Gugur
The second change in Akademi Fantasia format is the implementation of Operasi Gugur. In this format, students with the least improvement would be expelled by the professional trainers in order to give an opportunity for new students to join the academy. The announcement was made at the end of the second concert in Season 9 on 16 April 2011.

Immunity
Another change in Akademi Fantasia format is the introduction of an immunity system where the professional trainers would be given the power to exercise a veto on a student to spare him or her from elimination for that particular week. The immunity system, which consisted of 50% public voting from the audience and another 50% from a unanimous decision made by the professional trainers, was used in the eight concert of this season. The recipient of this system would advance automatically to the final concert without having to perform in the ninth concert. The new format change was revealed at the end of the sixth concert on 14 May 2011.

Auditions
Auditions were held in the following cities:
Promenade Hotel, Kota Kinabalu, Sabah - 28, 29 & 30 January
National Stadium, Bukit Jalil, Kuala Lumpur – 11, 12 & 13 February
In addition to the above cities, for the first time contestants were allowed to audition via online. To audition, they were required to upload audition clip of them singing a pre-approved song in YouTube. Then, they were required to submit their application form together with their video link. The internet auditioners were called back in order to go through the second stage until the fourth stage of the audition. Contestants were required to be between the ages of 18 to 45, and are Malaysian and Singaporean citizens who are not embedded with recording or management contracts.

On 18 February 2011, forty semi-finalists were revealed as the candidates of Akademi Fantasia. Nevertheless, only twenty-five semi-finalists were selected to move on to the next round which was determined through public voting via online and based on professional jury. The online voting commenced on 18 February 2011, and ended on 8 March 2011. 
The twelve finalists who made it into the academy were revealed in a press conference which took place in ÆON AU2, Setiawangsa.

Concert summaries

Tirai Concert
First Air Date: 2 April 2011

Note: Amy Search was announced as the Principal of this season at the end of this concert.

Week 1
First Air Date: 9 April 2011

 Guest judge: Adibah Noor

Week 2
First Air Date: 16 April 2011

 Guest judge: Fauziah Latiff

Week 3
First Air Date: 23 April 2011

 Guest judge: Norman KRU
 Note: Amir and Aida were expelled from the academy through 'AFGUGUR' after being deemed as the two students with the least improvement. They are replaced by Fina and Hazama based on the consensus achieved by the professional trainers through 'AFSERAP' scheme.

Week 4
First Air Date: 30 April 2011

 Guest judge: Rudy Imran

Week 5
First Air Date: 7 May 2011

 Guest judge: Edrie Hashim

Week 6
First Air Date: 14 May 2011

 Guest judge: Faizal Tahir
 Note: A new format known as the immunity system was introduced in this concert where the professional trainers would be given the power to exercise a veto on a student to spare him or her from elimination for that particular week.

Week 7
First Air Date: 21 May 2011

 Guest judge: AC Mizal
 Note: Following the introduction of the immunity system in the previous concert, it was announced that the immunity system would only be implemented in the upcoming concert. In addition, the public voting would contribute as much as 50% towards the selection of a particular student to be the recipient of the immunity system.

Week 8
First Air Date: 28 May 2011

 Guest judge: Sham Kamikaze
 Note: The choice of song for each student in this concert was determined by the audience. In addition, each student was given the opportunity to design the concept of their performance during the concert.

Week 9
First Air Date: 4 June 2011

 Guest judge: Dato' Siti Nurhaliza

Week 10
First Air Date: 12 June 2011

 Guest judge: Dato' Ramli M.S.

Students
(ages stated are at time of contest)

Summaries

Elimination chart

 The student won the competition
 The student was the first runner-up 
 The student was the second runner-up 
 The student was the third runner-up 
 The student was the original eliminee but was saved
 The student was eliminated
 The student was immune from elimination
 The students were expelled through Operasi Gugur or 'AFGUGUR'
 The students were entered into the competition, replacing students who were expelled through 'AFSERAP'

 In Week 2, it was announced that students who do not show any improvement will be expelled from the academy and consequently be replaced with new students.
 In Week 3, following the announcement of Operasi Gugur, Aida and Amir are expelled from the competition after being deemed as the two students with the least improvement. Consequently, they are replaced by two new students, Fina and Hazama.
 In Week 8, Fina became the recipient of the Immunity system. As a result, she automatically advances to the finale without having to perform in the ninth concert.
 In Week 8, there was no elimination. The accumulated votes were forwarded to the following week.

Cast members

Hosts
 Aznil Nawawi - Host of concert of Akademi Fantasia and Diari Akademi Fantasia

Professional trainers
 Amy Search - Principal
 Ning Baizura - Vocal Style
 Shafizawati Sharif - Vocal Technical
 Aris Kadir - Choreographer
 Fatimah Abu Bakar - English Language Consultant & Counsellor
 Adlin Aman Ramli - Drama & Performance

Judges
 Fauziah Ahmad Daud
 Hattan

References

External links
 Official Site
 Official Web Portal Akademi Fantasia

2011 Malaysian television seasons
Akademi Fantasia seasons